Vijay Armstrong (born 2 January 1976) is an Indian cinematographer, who has worked in the Tamil film industry. After making his debut with Pugaippadam (2010), he has worked on films including Thottal Thodarum (2015) and Charles's Azhagu Kutti Chellam (2016).

Career
Vijay had initially enrolled in a law degree but changed his career became a photo journalist for the Vikatan Group, before working as a Graphic and Web Designer for Digit Net Communications in Bangalore. Interested in pursuing a career as a cinematographer, he assisted in the camera teams of films including  Iyer IPS, Yaaradi Nee Mohini, Varalaru and Cinema. He consequently worked as an independent cinematographer in ad films, working for over fifty brands, and then worked on assignments for documentaries including the BBC documentary about PT Usha and another one for the ILO.

In 2009, he got his first big break as a cinematographer for Rajesh Lingam’s  Pugaippadam (2010), after which he worked on Maathi Yosi (2010). He subsequently worked on Raja Guru's Ondipuli and Gopi's Karuppar Nagaram featuring Akhil, both of which did not have a theatrical release. He also used practical lights instead of the traditional film set lighting in the web series Nila Nila Odi Vaa.

Filmography
 Pugaippadam (2010)
 Maathi Yosi (2010)
 Thottal Thodarum (2015)
 Azhagu Kutti Chellam (2016)
 Buddhan Yesu Gandhi (2016)
 Nila Nila Odi Vaa (2018)

Television 
 Nila Nila Odi Vaa (2018)

References

External links
 
 http://blog.vijayarmstrong.com/
 https://www.facebook.com/armstrong.vijay

Living people
Artists from Chennai
Cinematographers from Tamil Nadu
Tamil film cinematographers
1976 births